Silas Kikon (19 October 1956 – 25 June 2016) was an Indian singer and composer from Nagaland. He is known for his hit song ‘Ayo Choro Küpi Na’.

Biography 
Silas Kikon was born on 19 October 1956 at Lakhüti, Nagaland in a Lotha Naga family. Kikon was active in Nagaland during the 1980s and until the end of the 20th century. He was known for his hit song "Choro Küpi" and for his contribution to the promotion of Lotha songs in this modern era.

He died on 25 June 2016 at Civil Hospital, Wokha and his remains were laid to rest at his native village, Lakhüti.

On 25 October 2019, Kikon was posthumously awarded the Nagaland Musicians Collective (NMC) for excellence in music.

Discography
 ‘Choro Küpi’ (1993)

References

1956 births
Musicians from Nagaland
Naga people
20th-century Indian male singers
20th-century Indian singers
2016 deaths
People from Wokha district